Carlos Alberto Pellegrini, M.D., F.A.C.S., is the former president of the American Surgical Association and the current Henry N. Harkins Professor and Chair of Surgery at the University of Washington. He is the current president of the Society of Surgical Chairs, a regent of the American College of Surgeons, and a director of the American Board of Surgery.

Biography
Pellegrini was born to two physicians, and spent his childhood years in rural Amenábar, in Santa Fe Province, Argentina. He attended medical school at the University of Rosario Medical School, graduating in 1971 and remaining there for surgical training until 1975. He emigrated to the U.S. in 1975, in part due to dissatisfaction with the prevailing political climate in Argentina. He completed his surgical residency at the University of Chicago and began working at the University of California, San Francisco in 1979, moving to the University of Washington in 1993 to assume the chairmanship of its Department of Surgery.

Clinical focus
Pellegrini's clinical focus has been on minimally invasive surgery of the foregut. He leads the Swallowing Center and the Center for Videoendoscopic Surgery at the University of Washington.

Research and education
As a researcher, Pellegrini has investigated a wide variety of disorders and surgical procedures. He has been involved in surgical education research as well and has been involved in the University of Washington's Mini-Medical School, an annual series of lectures and seminars on medical topics open to the public.

Works

Books
Surgery of the Gallbladder and Bile Ducts (1987, with Lawrence M. Way, MD)
Surgery of the Esophagus (1997, with John G. Hunter, MD)

Selected articles
Van Eaton, Erik G. Karen D. Horvath, Carlos A. Pellegrini (2005). Professionalism and the Shift Mentality: How to Reconcile Patient Ownership With Limited Work Hours. Archives of Surgery 140:230-235.
Pellegrini, Carlos A., Andrew L. Warshaw, Haile T. Debas (2004). Residency training in surgery in the 21st century: A new paradigm. Surgery 136:5,953-965.
Pellegrini, Carlos A (2006). Surgical Education in the United States: Navigating the White Waters. Annals of Surgery 244:3,335-342.

Advisory roles
As a member of the Accreditation Council for Graduate Medical Education, Dr. Pellegrini was involved in the process of limiting U.S. medical residents to an 80-hour work week. He was a member of the American Surgical Association's Blue Ribbon Committee, which delivered an influential report on this topic and on surgical education in 2005
In response to the demands of the shortened work week, the department has pursued research into efficient and safe methods of handing off patients between shifts of residents.
During his tenure, the Department of Surgery established the Washington, Wyoming, Alaska, Montana, and Idaho Institute for Simulation in Healthcare (WISH), a center for surgical education through various forms of simulated exercises and training. He is currently the chair of the board of directors of WISH.

Dr. Pellegrini was named to the Robert Wood Johnson Foundation Clinical Scholars Program's National Advisory Committee in November 2008. The committee is responsible for overseeing the Robert Wood Johnson Foundation Clinical Scholars Program and selecting its participants.

References

Living people
People from Rosario, Santa Fe
Argentine people of Italian descent
National University of Rosario alumni
University of California, San Francisco faculty
University of Washington faculty
Argentine surgeons
American surgeons
Argentine expatriates in the United States
American Surgical Association members
Fellows of the American College of Surgeons
Year of birth missing (living people)